Linnton is a Portland, Oregon neighborhood located between Forest Park and the Willamette River along U.S. Route 30 (NW St. Helens Rd.), close to the agricultural community of Sauvie Island.  It borders the neighborhoods of Northwest Industrial on the south, St. Johns and Cathedral Park via the St. Johns Bridge across the Willamette on the east, and Forest Park (with which it overlaps substantially) on the west.  The neighborhood extends north somewhat beyond Portland city limits into unincorporated Multnomah County, ending at the Sauvie Island Bridge.

History 
According to Oregon Geographic Names, the Town of Linnton was platted in 1843 by Peter Burnett (later, the first governor of California) and Morton M. McCarver. The two named the community for U.S. Senator Lewis F. Linn of Missouri, a proponent of settling the Oregon Country. Linnton had its own post office from 1889–1975. Industrialization began in 1889 when the Portland Smelting Company started to build a smelting plant, followed by the Linnton Manufacturing Company starting in 1892. Columbia Engineering Works arrived in Linnton in 1910.

Linnton was incorporated on October 5, 1910, after a vote on September 12. At that time it was a company town for Clark-Wilson and West Oregon lumber mills, and the Columbia Engineering Works shipyard. In 1913, the Portland Gas & Coke Company moved its manufacturing plant to the town's southern border large oil refiners began to purchase sites for shipping and storage.  Linnton was soon annexed by Portland in 1915, bringing with it much of today's Forest Park.

In 2006 there was talk of secession following a rejection by Portland Mayor Tom Potter and two other city council members of a waterfront revitalization plan over toxic industrial waste concerns.

Parks 
 Clark & Wilson Property – NW Germantown Rd.
 Forest Park – NW 29th Ave. & NW Upshur St. to Newberry Rd. 
 Kingsley Park – NW St. Helens Rd.
 Linnton Park – NW 105th Ave. & St. Helens Rd.

Popular culture 
Walter W. Cole,  known as Darcelle XV, is from Linnton. The train hopping scenes from the movie Paranoid Park (2007) were filmed around the NW 107th Ave grade crossing.  Leave No Trace (film) follows the real-life story of a father and daughter living above St. Helens Rd. in Forest Park, a part of Linnton.

References

External links

 Linnton Neighborhood Association
 Guide to Linnton Neighborhood (PortlandNeighborhood.com)
 Linnton Community Center

1843 establishments in Oregon Country
1915 disestablishments in Oregon
Former cities in Oregon
Neighborhoods in Portland, Oregon
Northwest Portland, Oregon